Joshua Coleman, known by his stage name Ammo, is an American record producer and songwriter. He has co-written and produced songs for Beyoncé, Kesha, Katy Perry, Pitbull, Maroon 5, Britney Spears, Jessie J,  Jason Derulo, Mike Posner, Fifth Harmony, R. Kelly, Flo Rida, and Selena Gomez. Ammo has contributed to hits such as Maroon 5's "Sugar", Katy Perry's "E.T.", and Fifth Harmony's "Work from Home". He started working with Dr Luke in 2009, after signing with his production company Prescription Songs.

Selected discography

References

External links 

Living people
African-American record producers
Songwriters from Maryland
Musicians from Baltimore
Year of birth missing (living people)
21st-century African-American people